Hasan Qeshlaq (also Romanized as Ḩasan Qeshlāq; also known as Hasan Gheshlagh, Ḩasan Qeshlāqī, and Hasan Qishlāqi) is a village in Deymkaran Rural District, Salehabad District, Bahar County, Hamadan Province, Iran. At the 2006 census, its population was 1,322, in 299 families.

References 

Populated places in Bahar County